The African Security Congress (ASC) is a South African political party founded to lobby for the interests of private security guards, in particular for government to employ security guards directly.

In November 2017, former African National Congress (ANC) politician Makhosi Khoza, who resigned from the ANC after calling for Jacob Zuma to resign, was invited to be involved with the party in a leadership capacity, and joined a march on behalf of security guards in Germiston.

The party contested the 2019 general election, failing to win a seat.

Election results

National Assembly

|-
! Election
! Total votes
! Share of vote
! Seats
! +/–
! Government
|-
! 2019
| 26,263
| 0.15
| 
| –
| 
|}

References

2017 establishments in South Africa
African National Congress breakaway groups
Political parties established in 2017
Political parties in South Africa
Social democratic parties in South Africa